Waleed Hamzah Rasoul Al-Bloushi  is a Qatari football (soccer) player who was awarded the Asian Young Footballer of the Year by the Asian Football Confederation (AFC) in 1999. He played at 2004 AFC Asian Cup.  He is of Pakistani origin.

He plays as a forward for Al-Gharafa Sports Club.

Hamzah played for Qatar at the 1999 FIFA U-17 World Championship in New Zealand. He was chosen in FIFA's team of the Tournament.

On May 26, 2011, it was announced that Waleed Hamza had signed a 1-year deal to Al Wakrah after not playing for the majority of the season in Al-Arabi.

On July 14, 2012, Hamza move to Al-Gharafa Sports Club on a free transfer.

References

External links

Living people
Qatari footballers
Qatar international footballers
2000 AFC Asian Cup players
2004 AFC Asian Cup players
Qatari people of Baloch descent
Al-Arabi SC (Qatar) players
Al-Wakrah SC players
Al Ahli SC (Doha) players
Al-Gharafa SC players
Qatar Stars League players
1982 births
Asian Young Footballer of the Year winners
Footballers at the 2002 Asian Games
Qatari people of Pakistani descent
Association football forwards
Asian Games competitors for Qatar